Palmdale Airport may refer to:

 Plant 42 or LA/Palmdale Regional Airport, in Palmdale, California, United States (FAA: PMD)
 Lykes Palmdale Airport, in Palmdale, Florida, United States (FAA: FL73)